Zirconium(IV) sulfate is the name for a family of inorganic salts with the formula Zr(SO4)2(H2O)n where n = 0, 4, 5, 7. These species are related by the degree of hydration.  They are white or colourless solids that are soluble in water.

Preparation and structure
Zirconium sulfate is prepared by the action of sulfuric acid on zirconium oxide:
ZrO2  +  2 H2SO4  +  H2O  →   Zr(SO4)2(H2O)x
The anhydrous sulfate is also known.

These compounds adopt complex structures featuring 7- and 8-coordinated Zr centres.  Both water and sulfate serve as ligands.

Uses
Zirconium sulfate is used in tanning white leather, as a catalyst support, to precipitate proteins and amino acids, and as a pigment stabilizer.

References

Zirconium(IV) compounds
Sulfates